Miss Colombia 2012 was the 60th edition of the Miss Colombia pageant. It was held on November 12, 2012 in Cartagena, Colombia. 

At the end of the event, Daniella Álvarez of Atlántico crowned Lucia Aldana of Valle as Miss Colombia 2012-2013. She represented Colombia in Miss Universe 2013 but failed to place in the semifinals.

Results

 Color keys

  The contestant was a Finalist/Runner-up in an International pageant.
  The contestant did not place.

Special Awards

Scores

Delegates 
25 delegates have been selected to compete.

References

External links
Official site

Miss Colombia
2012 in Colombia
2012 beauty pageants